St. Denis' Church may refer to:
 St. Denis Catholic Church, North Whitefield, Maine, United States
St Denis Church, East Hatley, Cambridgeshire, England
 St Denis Church, Joondanna, Western Australia
 St. Denis' Church (Hopewell Junction, New York), United States
Church of St. Denis (Liège), Belgium
 St Denis' Church, Morton, Nottinghamshire, England
St Denis' Church, Otterham, Cornwall, England
 Basilica of Saint-Denis, Paris, France

See also 
 Saint Denis (disambiguation)
 St Denys Church (disambiguation)
 St Dionis, Parsons Green, London, England